Banagram is a small locality or village in Krishnanagar II CD Block in Krishnanagar Sadar subdivision of Nadia district of West Bengal, India beside Kamarhati, Nadia. Three Hindu Temple, one monastery, Banagram Radha Madhob Seba Ashram are there. To align the children towards books the young generation of this village organizes a book fair named Banagram Book Fair from the year 2019 with the financial help of the people of the village. This book fair has taken place in the minds of the people without any government help.

History 
Most of the people migrated to Banagram from Bangladesh at the time of the partition of India in 1947. According to senior villagers of this locality, before 1947 population of this area was very poor and it was full of trees and it is spinney like.

Geography 
Most of the land is used for cultivation. The main crops of Banagram are rice, mustard, jute and marigold flower.

Police station
Dhubulia Police Station serves the area of Banagram. The total area covered by the police station is 134.74 km2.

Post Office
Post Office of Banagram is Kamarhati Branch Post Office and postal code is 741154.

Economy 
Most of the people of Banagram depends on Cultivation. Also, many of them earn from Cottage industry.

Education 
In Banagram there is a primary school named, Banagram Board Primary School. For higher education students have to go neighbour village Kamarhati Chittaranjan High School

References 

Villages in Nadia district